is a Japanese indie rock band from Wakkanai, Hokkaido.

Galileo Galilei was formed in 2007 by singer and guitarist Yūki Ozaki, guitarist Sōhei Funaya, bassist Hitoshi Sakō, and drummer Kazuki Ozaki. Galileo Galilei signed to SME Records with guitarist and backing vocalist Fumito Iwai joining the band in 2009 and keyboard player Kazumasa Noguchi joining in 2011. Galileo Galilei released the albums Parade in 2011 and Portal in 2012 which reached #5 and #10 respectively on the Japanese music charts. Iwai and Noguchi left Galileo Galilei in 2012 and later formed the group Folks in 2013. Galileo Galilei released their final album Sea and The Darkness in January 2016 and announced their breakup after their final tour in April 2016.

In 2018, members of Galileo Galilei along with a support guitarist DAIKI formed a new band called Bird Bear Hare and Fish.

The film Kanseitou, directed by Takahiro Miki, is based on the Galileo Galilei song of the same name.

The song "クライマー" (English: Climber) from their album  Sea and The Darkness was featured as an end credit song in the anime Haikyu!!, and more songs were featured in other anime shows. A list can be visible here.

The band announced that they were reforming at warbear's "re:bear" live concert that took place on October 11th, 2022 after a 6 year hiatus. A new album and a tour titled "Bee and The Whales" is scheduled for 2023.

Members
  - vocals, guitar, keyboards (2007-2016, 2022-present)
  - drums, percussion, backing vocals (2007-2016, 2022-present)
  - guitar, backing vocals, keyboards (2009-2012, 2022-present)
   - bass (2022-present)

Past members
  - bass, guitar (2007–2016)
  - guitar (2007-2009)
  - keyboards (2011-2012)

Live members
 Chima - backing vocals, keyboards, percussion (2013-2016; also session vocalist 2009-2016)
 DAIKI - guitar (2013-2016)

Discography

Studio albums

Extended plays

Compilation albums

Singles

Promotional singles

Notes

References

External links
Official website 
Official Facebook

Japanese rock music groups
Japanese alternative rock groups
Musical groups from Hokkaido
Sony Music Entertainment Japan artists
Japanese indie rock groups
Musical groups established in 2007
Musical groups disestablished in 2016
2007 establishments in Japan
2016 disestablishments in Japan